James Chalmers (4 August 1841 – 8 April 1901) was a Scottish-born missionary, active in New Guinea.

Early life
James Chalmers was born in the village of Ardrishaig, Argyll, Scotland, the only son of an Aberdonian stonemason. The family moved to Inveraray when James was seven. There he went to the local school, and then to grammar school for about a year when he was 13. Then he was employed in a lawyer's office at Inveraray, and before he was 20 decided to become a missionary. In 1861, he joined the Glasgow City Mission as an evangelist. Here he met the Samoan missionary, George Turner, who suggested he apply as a missionary candidate. Eight months later, the London Missionary Society sent him to Cheshunt College near London to carry on his studies. He was a good student, though not a brilliant one, and was already showing capacities for leadership. He was also always ready for practical jokes. On 17 October 1865 he was married to Jane Hercus and two days later was ordained to the Christian ministry. It had been decided that he should go to the South Pacific island of Rarotonga in the Cook Islands, although he had hoped to work in Africa.

Rarotonga
On 4 January 1866 Chalmers sailed in the missionary ship John Williams to Australia, where he arrived in May. After a stay of three months, he left for the New Hebrides (now Vanuatu). The ship ran onto an uncharted rock and had to go back to Sydney to be repaired. It sailed again and was wrecked in January, though all on board were saved. He arrived at Rarotonga on 20 May 1867.

Chalmers was initially disappointed to find the island partially Christianized, but soon found there was much work to be done in fighting drunkenness and in directing the natives' energies into wiser practices. He learned the language, did much teaching, and became personally popular. His Rarotongan name was Tamate. Chalmers also produced a monthly newspaper. He gained much experience which was to be used in his later work, but he felt a strong urge to devote his life to less-tutored men.

New Guinea

In 1877, Chalmers had his desire for pioneering work fulfilled and was sent to New Guinea, then an almost-unknown land. He and his wife arrived at Port Moresby on 22 October 1877. During the next nine years he explored much of southern New Guinea in dangerous conditions, and was everywhere the peacemaker. In 1885, Work and Adventure in New Guinea 1877 to 1885, which he wrote in collaboration with W. Wyatt Gill, was published in London. Next appeared Adventures in New Guinea (1886) and Pioneering in New Guinea (1887) solely by Chalmers. A year's leave in Great Britain (1886-7) generated much interest in his work.

After Chalmers' return to New Guinea, he did a great deal of exploring and gained a detailed knowledge of much of the country and its inhabitants. When British New Guinea was made a colony in 1888, Chalmers and his fellow missionary, the Rev. William G. Lawes, explained to the chiefs the meaning of the functions that were held. It had been decided that the colony should be governed in the best interests of the natives. It was no doubt largely the influence of the missionaries that made it illegal both to deport natives and to introduce intoxicants, fire-arms, and explosives. In 1893, Chalmers explored part of the Fly River in a steam launch, but found the natives extremely hostile. He had another furlough in 1894-5 and did much speaking in Great Britain. He also published Pioneer Life and Work in New Guinea 1877-1894 (1895), which contained a considerable amount of material from earlier books. Back at his work in 1896, Chalmers was anxious to further explore the Fly River and established himself for some time at Saguane off the Fly River delta. His last station was Daru. In April 1900 he was joined by a young missionary, Oliver Fellows Tomkins (son of Daniel Tomkins of Great Yarmouth - a plaque is situated in the United Reformed Church, Princes St, Norwich to Tomkins's memory). A year later, he was on a vessel with Tomkins near Goaribari Island, and was visited by natives who appeared to be in a dangerous mood. Chalmers resolved to go ashore and Tomkins insisted on going with him. Both men were murdered and eaten by the natives on 8 April 1901. There is a stained glass window to their memory in the college chapel at Vatorato. Chalmers is also included on a stained glass window in the Eltham College chapel in Mottingham, England.

Chalmers' first wife died on 20 February 1879. In 1888 he married Sarah Elizabeth Harrison, a widow from East Retford who had been a childhood friend of his first wife. Chalmers preached his last sermon in Britain at the Retford Congregational Church (a site now occupied by the Aldi supermarket). 'Lizzie' died in 1900. There were no children by either marriage.

Notes

References

Richard Lovett, James Chalmers: His Autobiography and Letters (London: Religious Tract Society, 1903).

External links

 
 

1841 births
1901 deaths
Scottish Protestant missionaries
Protestant missionaries in Papua New Guinea
Protestant missionaries in the Cook Islands
British expatriates in Papua New Guinea
British expatriates in the Cook Islands
People murdered in Papua New Guinea
Cannibalised people
British people murdered abroad
British evangelicals
Scottish evangelicals
People from Knapdale